Nuestra Belleza México 1998 was the 5th Nuestra Belleza México pageant was held for the second consecutive time at the Salon Teotihuacan of the Centro Internacional de Convenciones Acapulco of Acapulco, Guerrero, Mexico on September 19, 1998. Thirty-two contestants of the Mexican Republic competed for the national title, it was the first back to back victories in Nuestra Belleza Mexico history: Silvia Salgado from Nuevo León was crowned by outgoing Nuestra Belleza México titleholder Katty Fuentes also from Nuevo León. Salgado competed at Miss Universe 1999 in Trinidad and Tobago where she was a Semi-finalist in the Top 10. She was the second Neoleonesa to win this title.

The Nuestra Belleza Mundo México title was won by Vilma Zamora from Guanajuato, who later competed at Miss World 1998 in Seychelles. Zamora was crowned by outgoing Nuestra Belleza Mundo México titleholder Blanca Soto. She was the first Guanajuatense to win this title.

Results

Placements

 For the first and only time in the history of the contest was a tie in the top 10 among Yucatán and Chihuahua

Contestants

Judges
Verónica Castro – Actress
Andrés García – Actor
Dayanara Torres – Miss Universe 1993
Héctor Soberón – Actor
Alejandra Quintero – Nuestra Belleza Mundo México 1995
José Quintero – Photographer
Carla Estrada – Producer
Joss Claude – Stylist
Martha Chapa – Painter
Luis Manuel Rodríguez – Director & Producer

References

External links
 Official Website

.México
1998 in Mexico
1998 beauty pageants